Flex Ltd. (previously known as Flextronics International Ltd. or Flextronics) is an American Singaporean-domiciled multinational diversified manufacturing company. It is the third largest global electronics manufacturing services (EMS), original design manufacturer (ODM) company by revenue, behind only Pegatron for what concerns original equipment manufacturers. Flex's corporate headquarters are located in Singapore, and its administrative headquarters are in San Jose, California. The company has manufacturing operations in over 30 countries, totaling about 160,000 employees.

History

The company was founded in 1969 as Flextronics, Inc.

In 1990, the company was renamed Flextronics International, Ltd. and registered in Singapore. In 1993, the company received venture capital funding through Sequoia Capital, and became a publicly held company again in 1994. In 2000, the company ranked third on "100 Best-Managed Companies" by IndustryWeek. In 2006 Flextronics took over a part of the production of Lego, but in 2009 Lego decided to end relations with Flextronics and purchase the production facilities in Mexico and Hungary. On 4 June 2007, Flextronics offered to purchase Solectron for US$3.6 billion and thus making Solectron a subsidiary of Flextronics. The acquisition of Solectron was completed by end of October 2007, earlier than anticipated.

On 18 March 2009, Flextronics was invited to ring the NASDAQ stock market opening bell, signifying the day's start of trading and celebrated 15-year NASDAQ-listed anniversary. Mike McNamara (then-CEO) and a group of top executives represented the company at the ringing of the bell. On 25 August 2009, Flextronics announced that it was chosen by LG Electronics (LGE), a global provider of advanced digital products and applied technologies, to manufacture 19, 22, 26, 32, and 37-inch LCD television receivers at its Ciudad Juárez, Mexico facility for distribution to the North and South American markets. On 2 September 2009, Flextronics announced that Multek received Danaher Test and Measurement's 2009 Outstanding Supplier Award. The award was given based on quality, delivery performance, engineering support and cost for work with two of Danaher's business units, Tektronix and Fluke.

On 15 September 2010, Flextronics announced that it had been chosen by Brammo, Inc., former producer of electric traction motors and traction batteries, to be its manufacturing partner for the production and distribution of plug-in electric motorcycles and components. In 2010, the company signed an agreement with Lenovo to provide manufacturing for Europe. That same year, Flextronics also signed an agreement with Brammo to provide acquisition and manufacturing in North America, Asia and Europe.

In 2012, Flextronics incubated Elementum, a start-up supply chain management (SCM) company based in Mountain View, California. In 2014, Elementum was spun off from Flextronics as its own separate entity.

In 2014, Flextronics was named as the manufacturer of the Fitbit Force by the US Consumer Product Safety Commission in the context of a complete recall of the product due to rashes developing on the wrists of its users.

In July 2015 the company announced it changed the company name from Flextronics to Flex.

In September 2015, Flex acquired Nextracker, one of the leading solar tracker companies, for $330 million.

In November 2015, Flex, acquired Wink smart home platform to bring the Intelligence of Things "Home".  Flex has been a strategic partner to Wink, serving as their primary supplier of hardware and firmware, including the Wink Hub and Wink Relay, which include core intellectual property developed within Flex. In July 2017, Flex sold Wink to i.am+ for $38.7 million.

On 31 December 2018, Michael M. McNamara resigned as the company's Chief Executive Officer. McNamara worked at Flex for twenty-four years. He served as the company's CEO from 2006 to 2018. At the time of his retirement, Flex had $25 billion in revenue and over 200,000 employees worldwide. The Board of Directors hired an executive recruiting company to assist with its search for a new CEO. On 11 February 2019, Flex announced Revathi Advaithi as CEO. Prior to Flex, Advaithi was president and chief operating officer for the Electrical Sector business for Eaton Corporation.

Controversies

Breach of contracts
Flextronics was sued in what was apparent in breach of contract with Beckman Coulter Inc., a maker of medical devices. The case dates from 1997, when Beckman Coulter entered into an agreement with Dovatron, a unit of the Dii Group, to provide circuit boards for a Beckman blood analyser. Flextronics acquired the Dii Group in 1999 and, according to Beckman, shortly thereafter Flextronics refused to provide the circuit boards unless it bought other electronic components from the company.

Beckman filed suit in early 2001, seeking $2.2 million in damages, which were cited as the costs incurred in having to retool one of its plants to manufacture the circuit boards in-house. At the end of the trial, Flextronics paid $23 million for the damages.

Leak of USB charger confidential shipment data
A former Flextronics executive pleaded guilty to committing wire fraud and security fraud by providing confidential information related to USB charger shipment data used for U.S. based iPhones and iPods for the third and fourth quarters of 2009.

References

External links

Electronics companies of Singapore
Electronics companies established in 1969
Manufacturing companies based in San Jose, California
Singaporean companies established in 1969
Silver Lake (investment firm)
Companies listed on the Nasdaq
Companies based in Morgan Hill, California
1980s initial public offerings
Multinational companies headquartered in Singapore
Tax inversions